Timothy John Smith is a stage and screen actor. He has appeared in the films Central Intelligence, The Equalizer and The Judge. He has done extensive stage work in Boston  and New York. In 2014, The New York Times praised him for his "intelligent, sensitive performance" in the off-broadway play On a Stool at the End of the Bar.

A 2001 graduate of the Trinity Rep Conservatory, Smith has appeared in dozens of regional productions in New England and across the country. His turn as Bill Sikes in Trinity Rep's 2014 production of Oliver! drew rave reviews.  He has played major roles in numerous other regional theater musicals including Annie (Daddy Warbucks), Les Misérables (Jean Valjean), Man of La Mancha (Don Quixote)  and Jerry Springer: The Opera (Satan).

, he resides in New Jersey.

Filmography

References

External links
 
Official website of Timothy John Smith

Year of birth missing (living people)
Living people
American male film actors
American male stage actors